Rafael González (born 24 August 1958) is a Mexican judoka. He competed at the 1980 Summer Olympics and the 1984 Summer Olympics.

References

1958 births
Living people
Mexican male judoka
Olympic judoka of Mexico
Judoka at the 1980 Summer Olympics
Judoka at the 1984 Summer Olympics
Place of birth missing (living people)
Pan American Games medalists in judo
Pan American Games bronze medalists for Mexico
Judoka at the 1979 Pan American Games
Judoka at the 1983 Pan American Games
Medalists at the 1979 Pan American Games
Medalists at the 1983 Pan American Games
21st-century Mexican people
20th-century Mexican people